1982 Cline, provisional designation , is a stony asteroid from the inner regions of the asteroid belt, approximately 8 kilometers in diameter. It was discovered on 4 November 1975, by American astronomer Eleanor Helin at Palomar Observatory in California, and named after Edwin Lee Cline, inventor and friend of the discoverer.

Classification and orbit 

Cline is a stony S-type asteroid that orbits the Sun in the inner main-belt at a distance of 1.7–2.9 AU once every 3 years and 6 months (1,283 days). Its orbit has an eccentricity of 0.25 and an inclination of 7° with respect to the ecliptic. As a main-belt asteroid with a perihelion of less than 1.74 AU, it is not far from being a Mars-crosser (1.67 AU). The first precovery was taken at Johannesburg Observatory (Hartbeespoort, 076) in 1957, extending the asteroid's observation arc by 18 years prior to its discovery.

Physical characteristics 

The body's first and only rotational lightcurve of Cline was obtained by American astronomer James W. Birnsfield at the Via Capote Observatory , California, in November 2011. It gave a well-defined rotation period of  hours with a brightness variation of 0.36 in magnitude.

According to the survey carried out by the Japanese Akari satellite and the latest data from the NEOWISE mission of NASA's Wide-field Infrared Survey Explorer, Cline measures 7.2 and 8.1 kilometers in diameter and its surface has an albedo of 0.194 of 0.34, respectively. Previous results by WISE/NEOWISE also gave a diameter of 6.03 and 8.4 kilometers. The Collaborative Asteroid Lightcurve Link assumes a standard albedo for stony asteroids of 0.20 and calculates a diameter of 8.18 kilometers with an absolute magnitude of 12.8.

Naming 

This minor planet was named in memory of Edwin Lee Cline, a friend of the discoverer and a known inventor in the automotive field who "looked to space as the new frontier". The official  was published by the Minor Planet Center on 18 April 1977.

References

External links 
 Asteroid Lightcurve Database (LCDB), query form (info )
 Dictionary of Minor Planet Names, Google books
 Asteroids and comets rotation curves, CdR – Observatoire de Genève, Raoul Behrend
 Discovery Circumstances: Numbered Minor Planets (1)-(5000) – Minor Planet Center
 
 

001982
Discoveries by Eleanor F. Helin
Named minor planets
19751104